Leagrave railway station is located in Leagrave, a suburb in the north of Luton in Bedfordshire, England. Leagrave station is situated on the Midland Main Line 33¾ miles (54 km) north of London St Pancras International. The station is managed by Thameslink, and is served by the Thameslink route.

History
The station was built by the Midland Railway in 1868 on the eastern side of Leagrave Village as part of the extension to St. Pancras line. Passenger services began on 13 July 1868.

The old Midland station buildings still exist, having been carefully restored in the 1980s. The station buildings underwent some further alteration when ticket barriers were installed along with some external alteration to the façades where former windows were made into door ways. The buildings are locally listed as being of significant architectural merit.

Facilities 
There is a car park besides Leagrave Common ground just 10 minutes walking distance from Leagrave station towards Sundon Park. There are two entrances to the station, the main entrance via the original station buildings is from Station Road adjacent to the junction with Capron Road. The other entrance next to the southbound tracks on platform one, can be accessed from Grange Avenue.

The station has a PlusBus scheme where train and bus tickets can be bought together for a cheaper price. It is in the same area as Luton and Luton Parkway stations.

Services

All services at Leagrave are operated by Thameslink using  EMUs.

The typical off-peak service in trains per hour is:
 4 tph to 
 2 tph to  via 
 2 tph to Three Bridges via 

References

External links

Buildings and structures in Luton
Transport in Luton/Dunstable Urban Area
Railway stations in Bedfordshire
DfT Category D stations
Former Midland Railway stations
Railway stations in Great Britain opened in 1868
Railway stations served by Govia Thameslink Railway

de:Leagrave#Bahnhof